The 2007 Korean FA Cup, known as the 2007 Hana Bank FA Cup, was the twelfth edition of the Korean FA Cup.

Qualifying rounds

First round

Second round

Final rounds

Bracket

Third round 
Jeonnam Dragons, Seongnam Ilhwa Chunma and Jeonbuk Hyundai Motors won by default.

Round of 16

Quarter-finals

Semi-finals

Final

Awards
Source:

See also
2007 in South Korean football
2007 K League
2007 Korea National League
2007 K3 League
2007 Korean League Cup

References

External links
Official website
Fixtures & Results at KFA

2007
2007 in South Korean football
2007 domestic association football cups